Chua Cocani is a small town in Bolivia. In 2009 it had an estimated population of 1050.

Near Lake Titicaca there is a Naval base of The 3rd Independent Regiment of the Bolivian Naval Force.

References

Populated places in La Paz Department (Bolivia)